Shohola Creek is a  tributary of the Delaware River in the Poconos of eastern Pennsylvania in the United States.

See also
List of Pennsylvania rivers

References

Tributaries of the Delaware River
Rivers of Pennsylvania
Pocono Mountains
Rivers of Pike County, Pennsylvania